Ledin is a surname. Notable people with this surname include:

 George Ledin (born 1946), American professor of computer science
 Per Ledin (born 1978), Swedish ice hockey player
 Tomas Ledin (born 1952), Swedish singer, songwriter, guitarist, and producer
 Wendell L. Ledin Sr. (1897-1965), American businessman and politician

See also
Leden